Gscheid Pass (where Gscheid is a regional Austrian-German word derived from scheiden/gescheiden meaning "divide") may refer to the following mountain passes:

Kernhofer Gscheid Pass
Preiner Gscheid Pass

See also
Gschaid (disambiguation)
Gschaidt